Minnesota nice is a cultural stereotype applied to the behavior of people from  Minnesota and Wisconsin implying residents are unusually courteous, reserved, and mild-mannered against people who are not like them. The phrase also implies polite friendliness, an aversion to open confrontation, a tendency toward understatement, a disinclination to make a direct fuss or stand out, apparent emotional restraint, and self-deprecation.

Social norms 

Playwright and corporate communications consultant Syl Jones suggested that Minnesota nice is not so much about being "nice" but is more about keeping up appearances, maintaining the social order, and keeping people (including non-natives of the state) in their place. He relates these social norms to the literary work of Danish-Norwegian novelist Aksel Sandemose, the fictional Law of Jante, and more generally, Scandinavian culture. Garrison Keillor's A Prairie Home Companion discusses "Wobegonics", the supposed language of Minnesotans, which includes "no confrontational verbs or statements of strong personal preference".

Examples 
The generosity of state citizens has been commented on; the heavily-reported influenza vaccine shortage of late 2004 did not strike the state as hard as elsewhere since many people willingly gave up injections for others.  The concept has also received some support from the academic community; a national study by Peter Rentfrow,  Samuel D. Gosling, and Jeff Potter done in 2008 found that Minnesota was the second most agreeable and fifth most extraverted state in the nation, traits associated with "nice".

The tradition of social progressivism in Minnesota politics has been linked to the Minnesota Nice culture.

Minnesota nice was an influence on the Coen brothers movie Fargo, set in both Minnesota and neighboring North Dakota. A 2003 documentary about the making of the movie was entitled Minnesota Nice.

Criticism 
Journalist and Minnesota native Michele Norris argued the phrase has "undertones of irony and despair" following the 2020 murder of George Floyd in Minneapolis.

One theory suggests that the concept is a marketing myth.

See also

 Agreeableness
 Beverly Hills 90210 (TV show with Minnesota Nice tropes)
 Emotional trust
 Iowa nice
 Seattle Freeze
 Southern hospitality

References 

Nice
Personality traits
Pleasure
Virtue
Kindness
Stereotypes